The 2007–08 Ystalyfera RFC season was a further season of re-building with new, young players. The team began well with six wins and only two defeats into October. Unfortunately these defeats were two league games where the players performed admirably but were denied the results – Taibach home 5-8 and Bryncoch away 13-17. The Swansea Valley Cup provided Preliminary and 1st Round wins over Trebanos away 19-3 and Alltwen away 32-21. The Welsh Cup started with a Preliminary Round win over Skewen at Ynysydarren 26-14 only to lose at home 11-20 to Cardiff side Fairwater.

Despite a resounding 44-8 win at home to Hirwaun getting 6 tries, the lack of consistency resulted in the loss of the next three league games. This left the ‘Fera in the position of one win and five defeats, however the never say never attitude came to the front and consecutive victories over Pontycymmer 27-5, Resolven 16-15 away and Neath Athletic 3-0 at home stabilised the situation and left Ystalyfera mid table at the end of 2007. The New Year started again with the inability to apply and maintain team strengths and another three defeats was the outcome. Home wins over local rivals Abercrave 28-23 and Brynamman 23-17 again lifted the side in time for the Easter Tour to Halifax. This trip was a blessing in disguise for after returning Ystalyfera only lost another two games, notching up four wins and an amazing 34 all draw with Resolven. In this game Damian James and Phillip Thomas got two tries apiece, Jesse Patton a try and Mathew Scott kicking a penalty and three conversions. This form was to prove a beacon for the forthcoming season when the players in belief of their ability would achieve success.

On 15 April Ystalyfera were denied in a Swansea Valley Cup Semi-Final by our always ‘bogey’ side in the competition Abercrave 7-8 at home. Mathew Scott had scored a try which Damian James converted, but a period when two front row players were ‘sin binned’ off the field gave the visitors an opportunity and a try plus a penalty gave them the result.
Captain this season was the inspiring Paul Davies, top scorer was Jason Addey with 91 points closely followed by the ever present Damian James with 85. Leading try scorer was the much-experienced Phillip Thomas with 10 tries, Mathew Scott just short with 9.

Players Player of the year was Jonathan Evans for the second season and the Supporters favourite was Mathew Scott.

National League Division 4 South West

Ystalyfera 2007/08 Season Results

Ystalyfera 2007/08 Season Player Stats

References

Sport in Neath Port Talbot